Thomas Cantley (19 April 1857 – 24 February 1945) was a Conservative member of the House of Commons of Canada. He was born in New Glasgow, Nova Scotia and became a steel manufacturer and participated in numerous corporate directorships.

The son of Charles Cantley and Catherine Fraser, Cantley attended school at New Glasgow, then performed military service with the British Expeditionary Force, attaining the rank of colonel. In 1919, he was granted an honorary Doctor of Laws degree by Dalhousie University.

He was first elected to Parliament at the Pictou riding in the 1925 general election after an unsuccessful campaign there in 1921. He was re-elected to the House of Commons in 1926 and 1930.

Cantley was then appointed to the Senate on 20 July 1935 and remained in that role until his death on 24 February 1945.

Electoral history

References

External links
 

1857 births
1945 deaths
Canadian senators from Nova Scotia
Conservative Party of Canada (1867–1942) MPs
Conservative Party of Canada (1867–1942) senators
Members of the House of Commons of Canada from Nova Scotia
People from New Glasgow, Nova Scotia